Claudemir is the name of:

Claudemir (footballer, born 1988) (born 1988), Brazilian footballer who plays for Sivasspor in Turkey.
Claudemir (footballer, born 1984) (born 1984), Brazilian footballer who plays for Hapoel Tel Aviv in Israel.
Cacau, real name Claudemir Jeronimo Barretto (born 1981), German-Brazilian footballer who last played for VfB Stuttgart in Germany.